Crea-Tech was Japanese video game developer that was located in Koto, Tokyo, Japan and was founded by Hiroshi Miyaoka in 1988. The company was best known for developing the role-playing video game series Metal Max. They also developed many board games. The company developed console games mainly, but also had some computer games and mobile games.

Products 
 Metal Max series
 Metal Max – NES
 Metal Max 2 – SNES
 Metal Max 3 – Nintendo DS
 Tenkuu no Restaurant – PlayStation
 Tower Dream – SNES, PlayStation
 Itadaki Street 3 – PS2
 CATAN – PC, PS2
 Pikiinya! – SNES
 Genjū Ryodan – SNES
  Hero Connection – Mobile

References 

Video game companies established in 1988
Amusement companies of Japan
Video game companies of Japan
Video game development companies
Software companies based in Tokyo
Japanese companies established in 1988